Comin' Atcha! is the debut album by English girl group Cleopatra, released on 30 June 1998 by WEA. The album reached number 20 on the UK Albums Chart and has been certified Silver in the UK by the BPI. From the album came the singles "Cleopatra's Theme", "Life Ain't Easy", "A Touch of Love" and a cover of The Jackson 5's "I Want You Back".

On 28 December 2004, Comin' Atcha! was digitally reissued.

Writing 
The album was largely written by lead singer Cleo Higgins, who had written some of the songs while as young as 9 years old. It was recorded when Cleo was only 14 years old. When the original demos were recorded they were R&B and soul records which were later remixed into pop songs. Cleo often wrote about personal experiences or issues she felt she needed to address. On the track "A Touch of Love", Cleo goes into her whistle register, hitting F#6.

Impact 
Their debut single "Cleopatra's Theme" entered the UK Singles Chart at number 3, giving Cleopatra their first Top 5 hit single.

The next two singles, "Life Ain't Easy" and a cover of The Jackson 5's classic hit "I Want You Back", followed the same success, heading into the Top 5, gaining the girls Brit Awards and MOBO Awards nominations. They performed at the 1999 Brit Awards alongside Steps, Tina Cousins, B*Witched and Billie Piper and were also nominated for Best British Newcomer. In 1998 Madonna signed Cleopatra to her Maverick label and introduced them to the United States at Nickelodeon's 11th Annual Kids' Choice Awards, where they performed their debut single, "Cleopatra's Theme". It was released shortly afterwards and reached number 26 on the Billboard Hot 100 chart, and number 16 in the US Hot R&B/Hip-Hop Songs chart. The video reached number 4 on the TRL Top 10 countdown. Comin' Atcha sold over 300,000 copies in the US and entered the top 30 there in July 1998.

Track listing

Japanese bonus tracks

Credits

 Cleo Higgins – lead vocals, arranger
 Yonah Higgins – backing vocals
 Zainam Higgins – backing vocals
 Christine Higgins – backing vocals
 Shaun LaBelle – synthesizer, bass, drum programming, producer, keyboards, strings
 Steve Menzies – arranger
 Harry Morgan – percussion, piano
 Dik Shopteau – engineer
 Roger Troutman – backing vocals, guitar, keyboards, talk box
 Allee Willis – arranger
 Clem Clempson – guitar
 Brad Haehnel – engineer
 Ronnie Wilson – producer, mixing
 Kenneth Hayes – arranger
 Niven Garland – engineer
 Reggie C. Young – horn
 Marcellus Fernandes – mixing, mixing engineer
 Errol Walters – executive producer
 Milton McDonald – guitar
 Paul Eastman – arranger
 Cziz Hall – arranger
 Sinclair Palmer – arranger
 Tim Scrafton – arranger
 Damien Mendis – multi instruments, mixing, producer
 Sam Noel – programming, remixing, engineer
 Yvonne Sheldon – vocals
 Graeme Stewart – engineer
 Steve Christian – arranger
 Michael "Mickey D" Davis – executive producer
 Amichi Agoua – bass
 Big Ears – strings, Synclavier technician
 Stuart Bradbury – multi instruments
 Kadria Thomas – vocals
 Tyndale Thomas – vocals
 Dennis Charles – producer, mixing
 Barney Chase – remixing
 Brad Heshnel – engineer
 Dave Phillips – piano, keyboards, programming
 Kevin Armstrong – guitar
 David Barry – guitar
 Gary Bias – horn
 Ray Brown – horn
 Stephen Chase – mixing
 Renny Hill – engineer
 Andy Williams – vocals
 Maurice White – arranger

Charts

Certifications

References

1998 debut albums
Cleopatra (band) albums
Warner Music Group albums
Maverick Records albums